Franz Wilhelm Victor Christoph Stephan Prinz von Preussen (born 3 September 1943) is a German businessman and member of the House of Hohenzollern, the former ruling German imperial house and royal house of Prussia. From 1976 to 1986 he was known as Grand Duke Mikhail Pavlovich of Russia.

Biography
Franz Wilhelm Prince of Prussia was born in Grünberg, Silesia, as the son of Prince Karl Franz of Prussia and his first wife Princess Henriette von Schönaich-Carolath. He had a twin brother, Prince Friedrich Christian, who died three weeks after his birth. Prince Franz Wilhelm is a grandson of Prince Joachim of Prussia, the youngest son of Emperor Wilhelm II.

In 2002 Franz Wilhelm with Theodor Tantzen founded the Prinz von Preußen Grundbesitz AG, a project development and project management company which restores old buildings in Germany. In 2004, with financing from a group of investors, he purchased the Royal Porcelain Manufactury Berlin, saving it from insolvency.

Personal life
Franz Wilhelm married his third cousin once removed, Grand Duchess Maria Vladimirovna of Russia, great-great-granddaughter of Queen Victoria, civilly on 4 September 1976 at Dinard and religiously on 22 September 1976 at the Russian Orthodox Chapel in Madrid. Before his marriage he converted to the Russian Orthodox faith and was created a Grand Duke of Russia with the name Mikhail Pavlovich by his father-in-law Grand Duke Vladimir of Russia. Franz Wilhelm and Grand Duchess Maria had one son before divorcing on 19 June 1985 (they separated in 1982), at which point he reverted to his previous title. He married Nadia Nour El Etreby (born 2 August 1949) on 14 March 2019, to whom was bestowed upon marriage the courtesy style and title of Her Royal Highness Princess Nadia of Prussia.

Grand Duke George Mikhailovich of Russia (born 13 March 1981).

Titles, styles and honours

Titles and styles
In 1919 royalty and nobility were mandated to lose their privileges in Germany; thereafter hereditary titles were to be legally borne only as part of the surname, according to Article 109 of the Weimar Constitution. Styles such as Majesty and Highness were not retained.

3 September 1943 – 22 September 1976: His Royal Highness Prince Franz Wilhelm of Prussia
22 September 1976 – 19 June 1985: His Imperial and Royal Highness Grand Duke Mikhail Pavlovich of Russia, Prince of Prussia
19 June 1985 – present: His Royal Highness Prince Franz Wilhelm of Prussia.

Dynastic honours
Knight Grand Cross of the Sacred Military Constantinian Order of Saint George.

References

External links
House of Hohenzollern

1943 births
Living people
People from Zielona Góra
People from the Province of Silesia
Prussian princes
House of Hohenzollern
German twins